Phylloid hypomelanosis is a cutaneous condition, a syndrome occurring in patients with mosaic trisomy 13 or translocation trisomy 13.

See also 
 Riehl melanosis
 List of cutaneous conditions

References 

Disturbances of human pigmentation